The 1988–89 season was the 43rd season in FK Partizan's existence. This article shows player statistics and matches that the club played during the 1988–89 season.

Friendlies

Players

Squad information

Competitions

Yugoslav First League

Yugoslav Cup

UEFA Cup

First round

Second round

See also
 List of FK Partizan seasons

References

External links
 Official website
 Partizanopedia 1988-89  (in Serbian)

FK Partizan seasons
Partizan